James "Jim" Ballantine (born 30 August 1955) is an American film producer who is credited on multiple animated features and TV series, and whose first animation job was on Disney's The Little Mermaid. Masha and The Bear, The Ren & stimpy show

Ballantine's credits at Nickelodeon and DisneyToon Studios include The Ren and Stimpy Show (1991–95), Disney Toon Studios' Bambi II (2006), Brother Bear 2 (also 2006), and the Rayman series. Ballantine contributed two years to The Wild Bunch, an animated feature made at Animation Lab studio in Jerusalem, Israel.

He was nominated for an Emmy award in both 1992 and 1993 for his work on The Ren and Stimpy Show. He was in charge of production at Acme Filmworks in 2005–06. He is now head of Flying Bark Productions in Sydney.

Filmography

Producer
 Mobsters (1991)
 The Ren & Stimpy Show (1991-1996)
 Mickey's Once Upon a Christmas (1999)
 Bambi II (2006)
 Brother Bear 2 (2006)
 Blinky Bill the Movie (2015)
 Heidi (2015-2016)

Executive producer
 Rayman: The Animated Series (1999)
 The Woodlies (2012)
 The Woodlies Movie (2012)
 Vic the Viking (2013-2014)
 Maya the Bee Movie (2014) 
 Tashi (2014-2015)

Miscellaneous crew
 The Little Mermaid (1989)

References
Jim Ballantine at Variety.com
Jim Ballantine in the  Hollywood Reporter
Jim Ballantine at AWN.com

External links

1955 births
American film producers
Living people